Nyaruko: Crawling with Love is a Japanese anime television series based on the light novels by Manta Aisora. The story revolves around a Nyarlathotep known as Nyaruko who is sent to Earth to protect the human boy, Mahiro Yasaka. The animated part of the franchise consists of two flash anime series produced by DLE and an anime television series by Xebec.

The flash series consist of an original video animation series titled , which was released between October 23, 2009, and March 15, 2010, and a television sequel series titled , which aired in Japan from December 10, 2010, to February 25, 2011. The Xebec animated anime television series, titled , aired on TV Tokyo between April 10 and June 26, 2012. All three series are being streamed by Crunchyroll since 2012, and Nyarko-san: Another Crawling Chaos was simulcast.

A 10-minute original episode on DVD was offered for buying all of the TV anime series Blu-ray Disc or DVD volumes.

A second season called  aired in Japan between April 8 and July 1, 2013, on TV Tokyo and was streamed with English subtitles by Crunchyroll. The second season used the song  by Ushiro kara Haiyori-tai G (Kana Asumi, Miyu Matsuki and Yuka Ōtsubo) as an opening theme and six different songs as ending themes. An original episode on DVD was released for buying all of the second season's Blu-ray Disc or DVD volumes.

Episode list

Haiyoru! Nyaruani (2009)

Haiyoru! Nyaruani: Remember My Mr. Lovecraft (2010)

OVA (2011)

Nyarko-san: Another Crawling Chaos (2012)

OVA (2012)

Nyarko-san: Another Crawling Chaos W (2013)

OVA (2014)

Nyarko-san: Another Crawling Chaos F (2015)

Notes

References

Nyaruko Crawling With Love